Jando Pulang is a traditional drink in Kuala Pilah, Negeri Sembilan, Malaysia. It is suitable to drink with lunch and during hot days.

References 

Malaysian drinks
Non-alcoholic drinks
Non-alcoholic mixed drinks